Alisma canaliculatum, commonly known as channelled water plantain, is a species of plants in the Alismataceae. It is native to Japan, Korea, the Ryukyu Islands, Taiwan, the Kuril Islands, and China (Anhui, Fujian, Guizhou, Henan, Hubei, Hunan, Jiangsu, Jiangxi, Shandong, Sichuan, Zhejiang).

Alisma canaliculatum is a perennial herb with tubers up to 3 cm across. Leaves are lanceolate, up to 50 cm long. Flowers are white, borne in a branching panicle.

References

External links
Plants For a Future
택사 Alisma canaliculatum A.Br. & Bouche
Cá Xinh, Nếu bạn thích nội dung này, hãy chia sẻ, Cây thủy sinh – Alisma canaliculatum, in Vietnamese

canaliculatum
Freshwater plants
Flora of Zhejiang
Flora of Taiwan
Flora of Sichuan
Flora of Shandong
Flora of Jiangxi
Flora of Jiangsu
Flora of Hunan
Flora of Hubei
Flora of Henan
Flora of Guizhou
Flora of Fujian
Flora of Anhui
Flora of Korea
Flora of China
Flora of Russia
Flora of the Ryukyu Islands
Flora of Japan
Plants described in 1867
Taxa named by Alexander Braun